Dujayl or Dujail ("Little Tigris") is the diminutive of Dijla, the Arabic name for the Tigris. It may refer to:

The Dujayl Canal in central Iraq
Dujail, a town in Iraq and the seat of Dujail District
The Dujail Massacre which took place in the town
The medieval Arabic name for the Karun